Goodson is an English surname.

Goodson may also refer to:

Goodson, Missouri
HMS Goodson (K480), British warship
Goodson Records, A British record company and label that produced flexible records active 1928-1931